Local television is the most significant media platform in Yemen. Given the low literacy rate in the country, television is the main source of news for Yemenis. There are six free-to-air channels currently headquartered in Yemen, of which four are state-owned. 

The government runs four terrestrial television channels: Yemen TV (the flagship national TV station), Aden TV, Sheba TV (aimed at youth and students) and Al Iman TV (covers religious issues). The Yemeni satellite channel is aimed at Yemeni expatriates abroad, whilst the opposition channel, Suhail TV, is currently headquartered in Riyadh. Due to the high price of satellite dishes relative to the local levels of income, terrestrial channels have the highest penetration, and there is minimal penetration of pay-TV.

Until recently, Al Jazeera and Al Arabiya were the most popular channels for news and information about events in Yemen, however Suhail TV gained in popularity after the political uprisings. A survey conducted by the BBC in 2010, revealed that only 14% of viewers preferred to watch Yemeni state-run TV rather than international satellite channels, suggesting strong preference for satellite channels from overseas.

List of channels
Yemen has around 15 television channels. These channels are:
 Yemen television channel: The first official channel started broadcasting in 1975 in North Yemen as local media, joined other Arab channels via INTELSAT-59 in 1995 and later Nilesat.
 Yamania television channel: This channel was founded in 1980 in the South of Yemen as "Aden channel" and was renamed after the unity of Yemen.
 Al-Saeeda television channel: New television channel opened in 2007 and is broadcasting via Nilesat.
 Suhail television channel: This channel started its test programs in May 2009 on Nilesat and Arabsat, but soon after (about 2 months) closed upon the government request to Kuwait, reasoning that the channel is broadcasting against the law, especially while Yemen is still engaged in Shia insurgency. The station however could broadcast again from an unknown area via Nilesat at the new frequency, 11595 MHz.
 Al-Iman television channel: Islamic dedicated channel opened recently in 2008 as a moderate channel against radicalism and terror.

See also
 Radio in Yemen

References

 
Television stations